Grenfell Athletic Football Club is a association football club based in London, England. They have competed in the Middlesex County Football League Premier Division.

History

Grenfell Athletic was founded in 2017.

References

2017 establishments in England
Football clubs in England
Middlesex County Football League